Zuzana Stromková (born 21 May 1990) is a Slovak freestyle skier. She competed at the 2014 Winter Olympics, where she placed 20th in slopestyle. 
 
Stromková won a bronze medal in Slopestyle at the FIS Freestyle Ski and Snowboarding World Championships 2015.

References

External links

1990 births
Living people
Slovak female freestyle skiers
Olympic freestyle skiers of Slovakia
Freestyle skiers at the 2014 Winter Olympics
Place of birth missing (living people)
Universiade medalists in freestyle skiing
Universiade silver medalists for Slovakia
Competitors at the 2015 Winter Universiade